The Airframes Unlimited T-2 is an American powered parachute designed and produced by Airframes Unlimited of Athens, Texas.

The aircraft was originally offered as plans only by Powered Parachute Plans, also of Athens, Texas. When parts for complete aircraft were made available these were supplied by Airframes Unlimited and gradually the two enterprises were unified under the latter name.

Design and development
The aircraft was designed to comply with the US Experimental - Amateur Built rules. It features a parachute-style high-wing, two-seats-in-tandem, tricycle landing gear and accepts a wide variety of two stroke and four stroke engines mounted in pusher configuration.

The aircraft is built from welded 4130 steel tubing, with a 6061-T6 aluminum engine mount plate. In flight steering is accomplished via levers that actuate the canopy brakes, creating roll and yaw. On the ground the aircraft has lever-controlled nosewheel steering. The main landing gear incorporates spring rod suspension. The design uses an overhead adjustable canopy hang point, called a "cg spreader bar" to establish the correct canopy attachment point and hence the aircraft's flight attitude and torque offset.

The aircraft was originally supplied only in the form of illustrated plans provided on a CD-ROM in Microsoft Word .doc format. Later parts and sub-assemblies were made available and then complete carriages, less canopy, propeller and engine.

Specifications (T2)

References

External links

T-2
1990s United States ultralight aircraft
Single-engined pusher aircraft
Powered parachutes